Charles Street may refer to:

People
Charles E. Street, American football player and coach

Places
Charles Street (Baltimore)
Charles Street (Boston)
Charles Street Jail
Charles Street, Mayfair, in London
Charles Street (Manhattan)
Charles Street (Perth)

Charles Street, Cardiff, Wales, named after Charles Vachell